Shaun Sutter (born June 2, 1980) is a Canadian former professional ice hockey forward. He was selected by the Calgary Flames in the 4th round (102nd overall) of the 1998 NHL Entry Draft.

Shaun is a member of the Sutter family. His father, Brian Sutter, is a former NHL player and was the head coach of the Calgary Flames when that team drafted Shaun in the 4th round of the 1998 NHL Entry Draft - but never made it to the NHL. He spent the early years of his career in the AHL and ECHL, before heading in 2005 to Europe to play in the British Elite Ice Hockey League where he played with the Nottingham Panthers, Sheffield Steelers, and Belfast Giants.

Upon his retirement, Sutter became the assistant coach of the Western Hockey League's Regina Pats. serving in that role during the 2009-10 WHL season. He is currently with the Red Deer Rebels, serving as their Assistant General Manager.

Career statistics

References

External links

1980 births
Belfast Giants players
Calgary Flames draft picks
Calgary Hitmen players
Florence Pride players
Fresno Falcons players
Ice hockey people from Alberta
Johnstown Chiefs players
Lethbridge Hurricanes players
Living people
Lowell Lock Monsters players
Medicine Hat Tigers players
Nottingham Panthers players
Nyköpings Hockey players
Saint John Flames players
Sheffield Steelers players
Sportspeople from Red Deer, Alberta
Shaun
Canadian expatriate ice hockey players in England
Canadian expatriate ice hockey players in Sweden
Canadian expatriate ice hockey players in the United States
Canadian ice hockey right wingers
Canadian expatriate ice hockey players in Northern Ireland
Canadian expatriate ice hockey players in Germany
Canadian expatriate ice hockey players in Italy